Felix (Greek: Φῆλιξ, died 141) was the bishop of Byzantium for five years (136–141 AD). He succeeded Bishop Eleutherius. He was in office during the rule of emperors Hadrian and Antoninus Pius. His successor was Polycarpus II.

References 

2nd-century Romans
2nd-century Byzantine bishops
Bishops of Byzantium
141 deaths
Year of birth unknown